The Heritage Transport Museum is India's major museum dealing with the history of human transportation. It is located at Tauru (Taoru) in the Gurgaon district of the state of Haryana. The collection focuses on the development of transport in India. It is situated on 3.01 acres and has 95,000 square feet of exhibition galleries. When it opened in 2013 it became India's largest private museum.

Organization
The museum is laid out in twelve collections:
Automobile Gallery
Pre-mechanised Transportation
Heavy Mechanised Transportation
Railways
Aviation
Rural Transportation
Two-Wheelers
Collectible India Toys on Transport
Historical Collections
Maritime Gallery
Contemporary Art Gallery
Tribal Art

Notes and references

External links
 Photographs 

Transport museums in India
2013 establishments in Haryana
Buildings and structures in Gurgaon
Museums established in 2013
Museums in Haryana